Pullur  is a village in Siddipet District in the state of Telangana, India.

Geography
It has an average elevation of 475 metres (1558 feet). Pullur is major village in Siddipet Mandal. It is situated 7 km away from Siddipet town and on the way from siddipet to Nizamabad. Another "Pullur" in the same name are located in Thrissur and Malappuram districts in Kerala and Ramnad district in Tamil Nadu.

Demographics
 India census, Pullur had a population of 14,157 with 6,862 males and 7,295 females.

References

Villages in Siddipet district